Macy Rodman (born 1989/1990) is an American singer-songwriter, comedian, podcaster, and performance artist. Rodman's style combines punk and rock with 90's inspired club-pop beats, eliciting comparisons to PJ Harvey, Sinéad O’Connor, Björk, Portishead, Madonna, Liz Phair, and Courtney Love. She has released three studio albums, The Lake (2017), Endless Kindness (2019), and Unbelievable Animals (2021).

Early and personal life 
Rodman is originally from Juneau, Alaska, and moved to New York City in 2008 to go to the Parsons School of Design. She later dropped out. Rodman is a transgender woman and started her transition shortly after moving to the city. She lives in Brooklyn, New York.

Career 
Rodman became involved in the Brooklyn drag scene after moving to New York through DJing and performing. She then began to host a weekly alternative drag show called Bathsalts. In June 2022, Rodman was featured on the cover of My Comrade, an underground magazine covering drag.

Rodman released her debut EP, Help, in 2016. Her first two albums, The Lake and Endless Kindness, were released in 2017 and 2019 respectively, on Sweat Equity. She released two remix EPs, called Neovaginal Dilation Expansion Packs, in 2020 for her songs "Berlin" and "Vaseline". Rodman signed to Shamir's Accidental Popstar Records in 2021, and released her third studio album, Unbelievable Animals, the same year. Rodman wrote the songs for the album during the COVID-19 lockdown. The album consists of twelve songs written in the span of a month deals with heartbreak and pandemic anxiety and combines "radio-rock shine with dirt-punk roots, like the energy in a '90s nightclub", with "a dash of Ray of Light-esque experimental pop and Chromatica-style club bangers." In 2022, she produced Ysak's single "Crossroads." On March 4, 2022, Rodman released an EP of Unbelievable Animals remixes called Uncontrollable Flammables, featuring remixes from Ariel Zetina, False Witness, Veronica Electronica, Michete, Yufi, Jim Cannon, Penelopi, So Drove, and M Zavos.

Rodman hosts the improvisational comedy podcast Nymphowars with Theda Hammel.

Discography

Studio albums

Remix albums

Extended plays

Singles

References

External links
 

American drag queens
American indie pop musicians
American performance artists
American punk rock musicians
American women comedians
American women podcasters
American podcasters
American women singer-songwriters
Comedians from Alaska
Experimental pop musicians
LGBT people from Alaska
Living people
Musicians from Alaska
People from Juneau, Alaska
Psychedelic musicians
Transgender comedians
Transgender women musicians
Transgender drag performers
Women in punk
Year of birth missing (living people)
American LGBT singers
Transgender singers
American LGBT comedians